Death and the Civil War is a 2012 documentary film by Ric Burns. It was aired as an episode of American Experience on PBS.

The film was inspired by the book This Republic of Suffering by Drew Faust.

References

External links
 

American Experience
2012 films
2012 documentary films
Documentary films about the American Civil War
Films directed by Ric Burns
2012 television films
2010s American films